Heaven's Lost Property is a Japanese manga series written and illustrated by Suu Minazuki. It began monthly serialization in the May 2007 issue of Shōnen Ace sold on March 26, 2007 and concluded with the March 2014 issue sold on January 26, 2014. The first tankōbon was released by Kadokawa Shoten on September 26, 2007, with a total of 20 tankōbon released in Japan.  Chapter titles are often suffixed with two exclamation points.

In addition, a four-panel comic, titled , illustrated by ms, was developed and published in the inaugural issue of Kadokawa Shoten's 4-Koma Nano Ace magazine (published on March 9, 2011), and continued in Shōnen Ace until its conclusion on March 26, 2011. It focuses on the lives of Astraea, Nymph, and Ikaros.


Volume list

References

Heaven's Lost Property